Nicholas Scott Haden (born November 7, 1962) is a former American football center in the National Football League (NFL) who played for the Philadelphia Eagles. He played college football at Penn State University.

References 

1962 births
Living people
Players of American football from Pittsburgh
American football centers
Penn State Nittany Lions football players
Philadelphia Eagles players